Utube or u-tube may refer to:
 Oscillating U-tube, a technique to determine the density of fluids
 Universal Tube & Rollform Equipment, a company
 U-tube, a design for tubing in a nuclear power steam generator

See also
 U-bend, in plumbing
 YouTube, a video-sharing website